2020 Blaublitz Akita season. The annual club slogan is "結". "Chuggernaut" Akita clinched its second J3 League title with six games to spare after a 2-0 win over Gamba Osaka U-23, and have been promoted to J2 on November 18, 2020. Blaublitz has earned the 4th seed in the Emperor's Cup.

Squad
As of  2020.

J3 League

Emperor's Cup

Other games

Gallery

References

External links
 J.League official site
Regista Awards 2020

Blaublitz Akita
Blaublitz Akita seasons